Enrique Padilla (born 12 June 1890, date of death unknown) was an Argentine polo player who competed in the 1924 Summer Olympics. In 1924 he was part of the Argentine polo team, which won the gold medal.

References

External links
profile

1890 births
Year of death missing
Argentine polo players
Olympic polo players of Argentina
Polo players at the 1924 Summer Olympics
Olympic gold medalists for Argentina
Medalists at the 1924 Summer Olympics
Olympic medalists in polo